Charles Keyser Edmunds (1876–8 January 1949) was an American engineer and physicist who served as president of Lingnan University in Canton, China, and Pomona College in Claremont, California.

Life and career
Edmunds was born in Baltimore and attended Johns Hopkins University, graduating in 1897.

He taught physics at the University of Utah during the 1898–1899 academic year, and subsequently moved to China to teach physics and engineering at Lingnan University in Canton, China. He became president of Lingnan in 1907, serving until 1924.

He moved back to the United States in 1928, to serve as president of Pomona College, becoming the college's first non-clergy president. During his tenure, he focused on Pomona's residential life, overseeing the construction of several dormitories and dining facilities, including Frary Dining Hall and the Clark dormitories. He also inspired a growing interest in Asian culture at the college. He retired in 1941, and later that year received the Order of the Jade from China. He died after being struck by a car while crossing Route 66 in Claremont in January 1949.

Pomona's original student center was named the Edmunds Union in his honor; it was built in 1937 and demolished in 1997. More recently, an academic building opened in 2007 was named Edmunds Hall in his honor.

References

Edmunds
1876 births
Johns Hopkins University alumni
1949 deaths